Moni Swapan Dewan (born 18 May 1954) is a Bangladesh Nationalist Party politician, ethnic Chakma, and a former member of parliament from the Chittagong Hill Tracts. He is also the former deputy minister for Hill Tracts Affairs.

Career 
Moni Swapan Dewan was appointed the State Minister of Chittagong Hill Tracts Affairs in the 2001 to 2006 Bangladesh Nationalist Party government. He called for the recognition of ethnic minority in the constitution of Bangladesh in 2006.

References 

Bangladesh Nationalist Party politicians
Living people
8th Jatiya Sangsad members
People from Rangamati District
1954 births